In rock climbing, a bolt is a permanent anchor fixed into a hole drilled in the rock as a form of climbing protection.  Most bolts are either self-anchoring expansion bolts or fixed in place with liquid resin. Climbing routes that are bolted as known as sport climbs, and those that do not use (or allow) bolts, are known as traditional climbs.

Description
While bolts are commonplace in rock and gym climbing there is no universal vocabulary to describe them. Generally, a bolt hanger or a fixed hanger is a combination of a fixed bolt and a specialized stainless steel hanger designed to accept a carabiner, whereas in certain regions a bolt runner or a carrot describes a hangerless bolt (where the climber must provide their own hanger bracket and sometimes lock nut). A ring bolt has a loop on one end so it presents as a U-shape embedded in the wall.

A climbing rope is then clipped into the carabiner. Generally quickdraws or slings are employed between bolt hangers and the rope to reduce drag when ascending, belaying and rappelling.

Use
Rock climbing routes that have been bolted for climbing protection — but not as a source of aid to help progression — are called sport climbs.  Where a route has bolts to aid progression (i.e. a climber can pull on the bolt), it is called an aid climb.  In competition lead climbing, all of the routes are bolted.

Lifespan
Bolts degrade over time — particularly in coastal areas from salt, but also from stress corrosion cracking — and eventually, all sport climbs need to be re-fitted after a number of years.  The highest quality titanium bolts are too expensive to use regularly, and the next highest quality stainless steel bolts have an expected lifespan of circa 20—25 years (the cheaper plated stainless steel bolts have a shorter span); and in 2015, the American Alpine Club established an "anchor replacement fund" to help replace the bolts on America's estimated 60,000 sport climbing routes.

See also 

 Piton
 Climbing equipment

References

External links
Can you trust that bolt: what every climber should know, The Access Fund (2023)
 Access Fund and American Alpine Club Policy on Fixed Anchors

Bolt
Caving equipment
Sport climbing
fr:Point d'ancrage